Queen Elizabeth Elementary School may refer to:

In Canada:
Queen Elizabeth Elementary School (New Westminster), British Columbia
Queen Elizabeth Elementary School (Vancouver), British Columbia
Queen Elizabeth Elementary School (Belleville), Ontario
Queen Elizabeth Public School (Leamington), Ontario
Queen Elizabeth Public School (Picton), Ontario
Queen Elizabeth Public School (Sudbury), Ontario
Queen Elizabeth Public School (Ottawa), Ontario
Queen Elizabeth Public School (Sault Ste. Marie, Ontario)

See also

Queen Elizabeth School (disambiguation)
Queen Elizabeth's Grammar School (disambiguation)